Pedro de Villarreal (died 1619) was a Roman Catholic prelate who served as Bishop of Nicaragua (1603–1619).

Biography
Pedro de Villarreal was born in Andujar, Spain.
On 22 October 1603, he was appointed during the papacy of Pope Clement VIII as Bishop of Nicaragua. On 31 January 1604, he was consecrated bishop by Pedro Castro Quiñones, Archbishop of Granada. He served as Bishop of Nicaragua until his death in 1619.

References

External links and additional sources
 (for Chronology of Bishops) 
 (for Chronology of Bishops) 

17th-century Roman Catholic bishops in Nicaragua
Bishops appointed by Pope Clement VIII
1609 deaths
Roman Catholic bishops of León in Nicaragua